Vilma Beck (1810-1851), was a Hungarian writer and freedom fighter in the Hungarian Revolution of 1848.

Beck was active as a spy and agent in service of the Hungarian freedom fighters during the Revolution of 1848-49. She also reportedly sold information to the Austrians. She left Hungary after the defeat and moved to Great Britain. She died in prison custody after having been arrested for blackmail.

Notes

19th-century Hungarian women
1810 births
1851 deaths
19th-century spies
Women in 19th-century warfare
Hungarian female military personnel
Hungarian Revolution of 1848
People of the Revolutions of 1848
Women in European warfare